Juan Manuel Cichello (born November 1, 1975) is a former Argentine volleyball player (setter), current head coach of Emma Villas Volley Club.
The Argentine has served as assistant coach of Julio Velasco in Iran national volleyball team from 2011 to 2014. He was also assistant of his countryman Raul Lozano in Team Melli during the Rio 2016 Summer Olympics. He made a major contribution in promoting Molfetta from Serie A2 to A1 in 2012 and led the team in 2013-14 season.

Career as coach
In 2006-2011 worked with Argentina Junior & Youth.

 Argentina Youth
Boys' Youth South American Volleyball Championship
 winner: 2008, 2010
 runner-up: 2006

FIVB Volleyball Boys' U19 World Championship
 third place: 2009
fourth place: 2007

 Argentina Junior
Men's Junior South American Volleyball Championship
 winner: 2008
 runner-up: 2006, 2010

FIVB Volleyball Men's U21 World Championship
 runner-up: 2011
 third place: 2009

 Argentina 
Volleyball America's Cup
fourth place: 2008

 Qatar 
Asian Men's Volleyball Championship
fourth place: 2015

 Iran U23
Asian Men's U23 Volleyball Championship
 winner: 2017
Asian Men's Volleyball Championship
5th place: 2017

References

1975 births
Living people
Argentine men's volleyball players
Argentine volleyball coaches
Volleyball coaches of international teams